Lifestyle creep, also known as lifestyle inflation, is a phenomenon that occurs when as more resources are spent towards standard of living, former luxuries become perceived necessities.

Description
An individual's discretionary income could increase as a result of increased income or decreased cost, such as paying off a mortgage. As discretionary income increases, individuals are able to spend money on things that were previously unaffordable. Lifestyle creep occurs when spending increases at the same rate as income. It can be reflected in purchases, such as expensive vehicles or a second home.  Spending money on things with ongoing maintenance costs, such as club memberships, also are demonstrated in lifestyle creep.

Lifestyle creep tends to be insidious, so it can be difficult to realize it is occurring. This is why some experts have called it a “silent inflation”. Although it is difficult to perceive, it can be contagious as people compare their own lifestyle with others. Signs of lifestyle creep could include difficulty saving money and increasing debt. Making a budget and setting a limit on expenses could potentially limit lifestyle creep.

This phenomenon is common among young adults in their mid-twenties to early thirties. In this age group, rapid career advancements lead to more discretionary income which can lead to excess spending. 

It can also become a particular problem near the age of retirement, where individuals tend to have the highest earning potential and decreased costs, such as not having the financial burden of raising children.  When individuals retire and try to maintain a formerly lavish lifestyle, they can suffer financially. Furthermore, it is challenging to downgrade lifestyle.

See also
Hedonic treadmill

References

Family economics